Walapatala (Penumbra) is a 2008 Sri Lankan Sinhala drama film directed by Vijitha Gunaratne and co-produced by Kasheyapa Gunarathna and Nelum Gunarathna. It stars Jayalath Manoratne and Jayani Senanayake in lead roles along with Saumya Liyanage and Gamini Haththotuwegama. Music composed by Tharupathi Munasinghe. It is the 1107th Sri Lankan film in the Sinhala cinema.

Plot

Cast
 Jayani Senanayake as Sumana
 Gamini Haththotuwegama as Dr. Manoharan
 Jayalath Manoratne as Council member Victor Jayasundara
 Saumya Liyanage as Dr. Delgoda
 Lal Kularatne as Sergeant Banda
 Palitha Silva as Chartin
 Duleeka Marapana as Sheela
 Deepani Silva as Nurse
 Kumara Thirimadura - uncredited role
 Somasiri Alakolange
 Athula Liyanage as Amarapala
 Anton Jude as Piyasena
 Nalin Pradeep Udawela
 Dharmapriya Dias
 Swarna Mallawarachchi - guest appearance

Awards
 2008 Sarasaviya Award for the Best Director - Vjitha Gunaratne
 2008 Sarasaviya Award for the Best Supporting Actor - Saumya Liyanage
 2008 Sarasaviya Award for the Best Art Direction - Lal Harindranath

References

2008 films
2000s Sinhala-language films
2008 drama films
Sri Lankan drama films